Šljivovica is a village in the municipality of Čajetina, Serbia. According to the 2012 census, the village has a population of 472 inhabitants.

Population

References

Populated places in Zlatibor District